Kholombidzo Dam, also Kholombidzo Hydroelectric Power Station is a planned  hydroelectric dam in Malawi.

Location
The power station would be located across the Shire River, in the village of Kholombidzo, Blantyre District, in the Southern Region of Malawi. Kholombidzo, is the location of Kholombidzo Falls (formerly Murchison Falls), adjacent to the village of Chipironje.

Overview and history
In 2013, the government of Malawi advertised for bids to carry out feasibility studies for a power station with capacity of 160–370 megawatts, using US$2 million granted to Malawi by the African Development Bank (AfDB).

The contract for the feasibility study and project design was awarded to COBA, a Portuguese engineering firm. It is anticipated that the plant will be built under the public-private-partnership (PPP) model, with the Electricity Generation Company Malawi Limited (Egenco), representing the government.

Construction, cost and funding
The feasibility study put the cost of construction at US$435 million. The scope of work involves construction of (a) a dam (b) a powerhouse (c) a substation (d) service roads. It also includes the installation of (e) four turbines (f) transformers (g) generators and (h) the laying of transmission lines. Construction is expected to start in 2018 and conclude in 2021. In 2020, beginning of construction was pushed back to 2021, with completion planned for 2024.

See also 

 List of power stations in Malawi
 Electricity Supply Commission of Malawi

References

External links 
 Kholombidzo Hydroelectric Power Plant Feasibility Study: Project Appraisal Report.

Dams in Malawi
Hydroelectric power stations in Malawi
Proposed hydroelectric power stations
Proposed renewable energy power stations in Malawi